Burn Halo is the debut album by American rock band Burn Halo. The album was set for release in 2008 through Island Records, but after the album was completed Island elected not to release it. It was released on March 31, 2009 through Rawkhead Rekords. It entered at #129 at the Billboard 200, selling 4,800 copies.

Track listing

Singles

Dirty Little Girl

The album's first single "Dirty Little Girl" was released on November 25, 2008, and features Avenged Sevenfold guitarist Synyster Gates. The song has peaked at #19 on the Billboard Mainstream Rock charts.

The music video for "Dirty Little Girl" premiered on MTV on February 25, 2009. It was filmed on November 19, 2008 at The Slide Bar in Fullerton, California.

Save Me

"Save Me" was the 2nd single. It was released on radio on January 12, 2010. The song was used in the soundtrack for the WWE videogame WWE SmackDown vs. Raw 2009.

Chart performance

Album

Singles

Personnel
James Hart  – lead vocals
Neal Tiemann  – lead guitar 
Chris Chaney  – bass
Ryan Folden - drums
Daniel Adair  – drums, percussion
Allen Snake Jones Wheeler  – rhythm guitar
Additional musicians
Synyster Gates  – lead guitar/solo on "Dirty Little Girl" and "Anejo"
Joey Cunha  – additional guitar on "So Addicted"
Brian LeBarton  – piano on "Too Late to Tell You Now"
Keith Barney  – strings on "Fallin' Faster"
Stevie Blacke  – strings on "Too Late to Tell You Now" and "Back to the Start"
Zac Maloy  – percussion, additional guitar on "Too Late to Tell You Now" and "Saloon Song", acoustic guitar on "Gasoline", additional vocals on "Dead End Roads & Lost Highways" and "Gasoline"

References 

2009 debut albums
Burn Halo albums